Framework directives of the European Union:

By directive number
 Directive 89/391/EEC of 1989 to encourage improvements in the safety and health of workers
 Directive 2000/60/EC of 2000 in the field of water policy, see Water Framework Directive
 Directive 2002/21/EC of 2002 on a regulatory framework for electronic communications, see Telecommunications in the European Union 
 Directive 2007/46/EC of 2007 for vehicles, see Type approval#Automotive industry

By name
Employment Equality Framework Directive
Waste framework directive
Water Framework Directive

See also
 List of European Union directives

European Union directives